The Newbrook Observatory  (a designated historic building) was built in Newbrook, Alberta, Canada, by  the Stellar Physics Division of the Dominion Observatory and operated as a space observatory from 1952 until 1957.   The observatory was equipped with a Super-Schmidt Meteor Camera, one of only six built by the Perkin-Elmer Company used to observe meteors.  One of the observatory resident scientists, Art Griffin, was the first in North America to photograph the Sputnik 1 satellite (less than a week after its launch).

In 1970, the government consolidated astronomical research and the observatories at Meanook (similar nearby facility, c.23 miles NW) and Newbrook was closed.

See also 
 List of astronomical observatories

References

External links
 News story about getting the camera back in working order

Infrastructure completed in 1951
Astronomical observatories in Canada
Provincial Historic Resources of Alberta